Rauf Rustamli (born 11 January 2003) is an Azerbaijani footballer who plays as a midfielder for Gabala in the Azerbaijan Premier League.

Club career
On 8 August 2022, Rustamli made his debut in the Azerbaijan Premier League for Gabala match against Turan Tovuz.

References

External links
 

2003 births
Living people
Association football midfielders
Azerbaijan youth international footballers
Azerbaijani footballers
Azerbaijan Premier League players
Gabala FC players